Mohammed Abdullah Senussi (1 May 1981 – 29 August 2011) was the son of former Libyan Intelligence chief Abdullah Senussi. He was also known to be the first volunteer to fight against the rebels, and well-known in Libya for shooting down an American fighter jet above Misrata. On 29 August 2011, he and his cousin Khamis Gaddafi, were killed by a National Transitional Council technical.

Death
He and Khamis had been commanding Pro-Gaddafi forces in the 2011 Libyan civil war, especially Khamis, who commanded the Khamis Brigade. Senussi had been retreating after accomplishing what was asked of him by Gaddafi which was destroying the runways of Tripoli International Airport, in the process he engaged with NATO forces as well as ground troops and proceeded by meeting Khamis within the countryside of Tripoli which was bound to Bini Waled with a convoy after victorious anti-Gaddafi forces seized control of the capital of Libya, Tripoli, after a battle with Gaddafi Loyalists for the city in August.

When the convoy neared the city of Tarhuna, they clashed with NTC fighters resulting in the deaths of both Mohammed Senussi and Khamis Gaddafi. This was initially denied by Gaddafi loyalists. However, on 15 October a Syrian Pro-Gaddafi TV station that has been broadcasting audio messages from Gaddafi and his spokesman since Tripoli was overrun by NTC forces in August, confirmed their deaths, posting pictures of Khamis and Senussi and broadcast verses of the Qur’an saying that "they died fighting enemies of their homeland."

References

1981 births
2011 deaths
People from Tripoli, Libya
Gaddafi family
Libyan military personnel killed in action
People killed in the First Libyan Civil War